The 2022 Paraná state election took place in the state of Paraná, Brazil on 2 October 2022. Voters elected a Governor, Vice Governor, one Senator, 30 representatives for the Chamber of Deputies, and 54 Legislative Assembly members. The incumbent Governor, Ratinho Júnior, of the Social Democratic Party (PSD), was reelected in the first round with 69.64% of the votes. 

For the election to the Federal Senate, the seat occupied by Alvaro Dias (PODE), who was elected in 2014 by the Brazilian Social Democracy Party (PSDB), was at dispute. He was able to run for reelection but was defeated by Sergio Moro, the former Minister of Justice and Public Security of Brazil. 

Under the Constitution of Brazil, the governor will be elected for a four-year term starting 1 January 2023. Due to the approval of Constitutional Amendment No. 111, the term will end on 6 January 2027.

Electoral calendar

Gubernatorial candidates 
The party conventions began on July 20th and will continue until August 5th. The following political parties have already confirmed their candidacies. Political parties have until August 15, 2022 to formally register their candidates.

Confirmed candidates

Withdrawn candidates 

 Zé Boni (AGIR) - Boni withdrew his candidacy for the state government to run for the Chamber of Deputies.
 Filipe Barros (PL) - Federal Deputy for Paraná (since 2019). His name was withdrawn by the party that decided to join Ratinho Júnior's coalition. For this reason, Filipe will run for re-election in the Chamber of Deputies.

Rejected candidacies 

 César Silvestri Filho (PSDB) - Mayor of Guarapuava (2013–2021). Silvestri's name was not approved at the PSDB Cidadania Federation convention that would define his candidacy for the Government of Paraná, and for this reason, the former mayor ended up having his candidacy withdrawn. The federation nominated him to run for the Federal Senate seat instead.

Senatorial candidates 
The party conventions began on July 20th and will continue until August 5th. The following political parties have already confirmed their candidacies. Political parties have until August 15, 2022 to formally register their candidates.

Confirmed candidates

Legislative Assembly 
The result of the last state election and the current situation in the Legislative Assembly of Paraná is given below:

Opinion polls

Governor

First round 
Political parties have until August 15, 2022 to formally register their candidates. 

2021–2022

Second round 
The second round (if necessary) is scheduled to take place on 30 October 2022. 

Ratinho Jr vs. Requião

Ratinho Jr vs. César Silvestri Filho

Senator 

2022

Notes

References 

Paraná
Paraná gubernatorial elections
2022 elections in Brazil